Barakovo is the name of several inhabited places in Russia.

Barakovo, Kaluga Oblast, located at 
Barakovo, Ryazan Oblast, located at 
Barakovo, Orenburg Oblast, located at 
Barakova (also Barakovo), Chelyabinsk Oblast, located at 
Alëshki (also Barakovo), Tver Oblast, located at 
Burakovo (also Barakovo), Tver Oblast, located at 

similar names:

Pchëlkino (also Barakovo-Sarancha), Vladimir Oblast, located at

See also
Barakovo (disambiguation)

References
GEOnet Names Server, web page